Peter was a Roman usurper of the early sixth century AD, recorded in two minor sources: the Consularia Caesaraugustana and the Victoris Tunnunnensis Chronicon. He was a "tyrant" (meaning usurper) against the Visigothic rulers of Spain. When the Visigoths captured the city of Dertosa in 506, he was arrested and executed, with his head being sent as a trophy to Saragossa. Nothing else is known about him, but he seems to be the second Roman governor (after Burdunellus) to try to claim imperial authority in the Ebro valley of Spain after the fall of the Western Roman Empire.

Notes

Sources

Collins, Roger. Visigothic Spain, 409–711. Oxford: Blackwell Publishing, 2004. . 
Thompson, E. A. "The End of Roman Spain: Part III." Nottingham Mediaeval Studies, xxii (1978), pp. 3–22. Reprinted as "The Gothic Kingdom and the Dark Age of Spain" in Romans and Barbarians: The Decline of the Western Empire. Madison: University of Wisconsin Press, 1982. pp. 161–187. .

6th-century Romans
506 deaths
6th century in the Visigothic Kingdom
Year of birth unknown